A Gnostic Mass is a liturgical Mass administered by a Gnostic church. Several such churches exist, each with its own version of the Mass. Some of these are:

 Ecclesia Gnostica celebrates a traditional Gnostic Mass called the Gnostic Holy Eucharist.
 Ecclesia Gnostica Catholica's Liber XV, The Gnostic Mass written by Aleister Crowley.

External links

The Gnosis of The Eucharist by Stephan A. Hoeller of Ecclesia Gnostica
Gnostic Scriptures and The Gnostic Church by Stephan A. Hoeller

Gnosticism
Mass (liturgy)